A foreign national wishing to enter Lesotho must obtain a visa unless they are a citizen of one of the eligible visa exempt countries.

Visa policy map

Visa exemption 

Nationals of the following 48 countries and jurisdictions do not require a visa to enter Lesotho for visits up to 90 days:

1 - Up to 60 days.

Nationals of the following 22 countries and jurisdictions do not require a visa to enter Lesotho for visits up to 14 days:

1 - Including all classes of British nationality.

Nationals of China holding diplomatic or service passports do not require a visa.

e-Visa
Lesotho introduced an e-Visa system on 1 May 2017. 
Foreign citizens may apply for tourism, business, student and diplomatic types of visa online through the eVisa system.

Electronic visas are processed within 72 hours. Visitors with a single-entry visa to Lesotho may remain for a maximum period of 44 days. Visitors with multiple-entry visa may travel in and out of Lesotho only within 180 days. Visitors must apply for an extension if their stay is prolonged.

Transit
There are no transit facilities in Lesotho.

Visitor statistics
Most visitors arriving to Lesotho were from the following countries of nationality:

See also 

 Visa requirements for Lesotho citizens
 Foreign relations of Lesotho

References

External links 
Embassy of Lesotho in the United States

Lesotho
Foreign relations of Lesotho